Loreto Convent School is a private high school in Pretoria, South Africa, founded in 1878.

Loreto Convent School was founded on 7 June 1878 by Mother Margaret Mary Jolivet, Mother Joseph Colahan and Mother Teresa Colahan, at Loreto Convent, Skinner Street, with 20 pupils in the high school and 6 in the parochial school.

Notable former pupils
Lady Cicely Mayhew (1924–2016), first British woman diplomat.
Inez Clare Verdoorn (1896–1989), botanist

Notable former teachers
Anne van Zyl, education administrator

References

External links

Private schools in Gauteng
Girls' schools in South Africa
Schools in Pretoria
Educational institutions established in 1878
1878 establishments in the South African Republic